Henryk Jan Jabłoński (27 December 1909 – 27 January 2003) was a Polish historian and politician. After 1948, he became a politician of the ruling Polish United Workers' Party, as well as a historian and professor at Warsaw University. He served as head of state of the People's Republic of Poland between 1972 and 1985.

Life and career
Jabłoński was born in Stary Waliszew in the Warsaw Governorate of Congress Poland. From 1931, he was a member of the Polish Socialist Party (PPS). During World War II he fought in the battle of Narvik (Norway) and then joined the French Resistance. In 1945 Jabłoński become a member of the State National Council (KRN), and during the years 1946 and 1948 he had high functions in the PPS (chairman of Central State Committee and its vice-leader). He approved joining the PPS with the Polish Workers' Party (PPR, Polska Partia Robotnicza).

From 1947 to 1972, he was a deputy to the Sejm. In 1948 he was appointed professor at Warsaw University (from 1952 member of Polish Academy of Sciences – PAN). Between 1948 and 1981, Henryk Jabłoński was in the Central Committee of the Polish United Workers' Party (KC PZPR).

In 1972, on the initiative of Edward Gierek, Jablonski was chosen the de iure leader (chairman of the Council of State) of the People's Republic of Poland. From 1976 to 1983 he was a chief of the Front of National Unity (FJN, Front Jedności Narodu). From 1983 to 1990 he was chief of ZBoWiD, the Society of Fighters for Freedom and Democracy, an organisation of war veterans. In 1985 he was replaced as head of state by General Wojciech Jaruzelski. His wife Jadwiga Jabłońska died in 1999.

Honours and awards
Grand Cross of the Order of Polonia Restituta, earlier Commander's Cross
Order of the Builders of People's Poland
Order of the Banner of Labour (Poland), 1st class
Order of the Cross of Grunwald, 3rd class
Deed Combat Cross Polish Armed Forces in the West (1989)
Gold Medal of Merit for National Defence
Great Star of Honour of the Order of Merit of the Republic of Austria
Grand Cordon of the Order of Leopold (Belgium)
Order of Georgi Dimitrov (Bulgaria)
Order of the White Lion, First Class with Chain (CSSR)
Grand Cross of the Legion of Honour (France)
Order of the Two Rivers, 1st Class (Iraq)
Order of José Marti (Cuba)
Collars of the Order of the Aztec Eagle (Mexico)
Order of Sukhbaatar (Mongolia)
Great Chain of the Order of Prince Henry the Navigator (Portugal)
Great Banner of the Order of the Umayyads (Syria)
Order of the Flag of the Republic of Hungary, 1st class
Order of the October Revolution (USSR)
Order of Friendship of Peoples (USSR)
Order of the Badge of Honour (USSR)
State Award, Grade II – 1955
State Prize – 1964
Special National Award – 1979

External links 
 

1909 births
2003 deaths
People from Łowicz County
People from Warsaw Governorate
Politicians from Warsaw
Polish Socialist Party politicians
Members of the Politburo of the Polish United Workers' Party
Heads of state of the Polish People's Republic
Education ministers of Poland
Government ministers of Poland
Members of the State National Council
Members of the Polish Sejm 1947–1952
Members of the Polish Sejm 1952–1956
Members of the Polish Sejm 1957–1961
Members of the Polish Sejm 1961–1965
Members of the Polish Sejm 1965–1969
Members of the Polish Sejm 1969–1972
Members of the Polish Sejm 1972–1976
Members of the Polish Sejm 1976–1980
Members of the Polish Sejm 1980–1985
Polish People's Army generals
French Resistance members
Members of the Polish Academy of Sciences
Foreign Members of the USSR Academy of Sciences
Foreign Members of the Russian Academy of Sciences
Academic staff of the University of Warsaw
Recipients of the Order of Polonia Restituta (1944–1989)
Grand Croix of the Légion d'honneur
Recipients of the Order of the Builders of People's Poland
Recipients of the Order of the Banner of Work
Recipients of the Order of the Cross of Grunwald, 3rd class
Grand Collars of the Order of Prince Henry
Collars of the Order of the White Lion
Recipients of the Order of Friendship of Peoples
Recipients of the Order of Georgi Dimitrov
Recipients of the State Award Badge (Poland)